Christmas Wishes is a seasonal studio album by Canadian country music artist Anne Murray. It was Anne's first Holiday recording, released by Capitol Records in 1981.

The disc peaked at #34 on the Billboard Top Country Albums chart.  It stands as one of Anne's biggest-selling career albums, earning double platinum certification from the RIAA.  At the time of its deletion, it had sold nearly 3 million US copies.

Track listing

Personnel 
 Anne Murray – lead vocals, additional backing vocals (3), backing vocals (10)
 Brian Gatto – electric piano 
 Doug Riley – acoustic piano (1-6, 8, 9)
 Jack Lenz – acoustic piano (7, 10)
 Bob Mann – acoustic guitars
 Bob Lucier – steel guitar
 Tom Szczesniak – bass
 Barry Keane – drums 
 Rick Wilkins – arrangements and conductor (1-5)
 Peter Cardinali – arrangements and conductor (6-10)
 Bill Richards – concertmaster 
 Tommy Ambrose – backing vocals (1-9)
 Bob Farrar – backing vocals (1-9)
 Debbie Fleming – backing vocals (1-9)
 Bob Hamper – backing vocals (1-9)
 Laurie Hood – backing vocals (1-9)
 Vern Kennedy – backing vocals (1-9)
 Judy Marchak – backing vocals (1-9)
 Colina Phillips – backing vocals (1-9)
 Janie Ray – backing vocals (1-9)
 Debbie Greimann – additional backing vocals (3), backing vocals (10)
 Bruce Murray – backing vocals (10)

Production 
 Jim Ed Norman – producer 
 Ken Friesen – engineer 
 Tom Henderson – recording assistant 
 Ken Perry – mastering at Capitol Mastering (Hollywood, California, USA).
 Paul Cade – art direction 
 Roy Kohara – art direction
 Phil Shima – design 
 Tim Saunders – photography 
 Morris Zaslavsky – calligraphy

Chart performance

References

Anne Murray albums
1981 Christmas albums
Albums produced by Jim Ed Norman
Capitol Records Christmas albums
Christmas albums by Canadian artists
Country Christmas albums